Billy Cranston is a fictional character in the Power Rangers universe. He is the Blue Ranger in the series Mighty Morphin Power Rangers, and was portrayed by actor David Yost. Billy is the only original Power Ranger to remain for the entire MMPR series, and is the second longest-serving Ranger overall behind Tommy Oliver. Until his departure, he was considered the brains of the Power Rangers team, creating many gadgets with which to solve problems that not even Zordon foresaw, and he even invented the first team's wrist-worn communication devices. A reimagined version of Billy (now black with black hair with a closer friendship with  Jason Scott) appears in 2017 reboot film, played by actor RJ Cyler.

Character history

Television

Mighty Morphin Power Rangers
Billy was one of the five "teenagers with attitude" selected by Zordon to become the original Power Rangers, along with Jason Lee Scott, Zack Taylor, Trini Kwan and Kimberly Hart. Billy became the Blue Power Ranger and was given both the Triceratops Power Coin and the Triceratops Dinozord.

Billy began the series as the stereotypical "nerd." The other Rangers, especially Trini, defended him loyally, but Billy later evolved to become a stronger individual. He was one of the top members of Angel Grove High's science club and often helped its younger members with their experiments. One such example was with Willy, a young boy he helped to create a virtual reality simulator for a Science Fair. In the episode "High Five," Billy created not only the wrist communicators the Power Rangers used, but also the interface that allowed the devices a remote access to the Command Center's teleportation unit.

It was revealed that, due to an experience in his youth when he was bitten by a fish during an experiment involving whirlpools, Billy developed icthyophobia: fear of fish. This fear would affect him well into his teens, and Rita would use a spell to exacerbate this fear. When he is the last Ranger left able to contend with the Goo Fish monster, Billy overcomes the spell and then, after helping to free his friends and defeat the monster, completely overcomes the fear itself on a fishing trip with Ernie, the owner of the Youth Center.

Each of Billy's teammates have a unique skill to offer the team and, in Billy's case, it was his vast intelligence. He sought out to improve himself physically, and the audience would see him transition over time from the suspenders-wearing "brain" to a confident, hyper-intelligent athlete with appreciable fighting skills, thanks in great part to Trini's Uncle Howard. Jason and later Tommy helped graduate Billy to the red belt level in karate.

Billy's intelligence would help the Rangers save the world on many occasions. When the Command Center was damaged, Zordon lost and Alpha incapacitated, it was his invention, a car called the RADBUG, that allowed the Rangers to travel to the Command Center. He performed a wide array of tasks, ranging from creating the method for which the Rangers would use initially to infiltrate Rita's Dark Dimension, to disarming the lock-out mechanism for Alpha's activated self-destruct, and many other achievements. Though Billy did manage to attract girls earlier in his "nerd-like" persona, it was after he began his journey toward self-improvement that he would garner more attention from romantic interests, even more so than the other members of the team.

Billy is accepted into the Young Scientists of America program. In Season 2, he befriends Zack's cousin Curtis when he becomes the newest student at Angel Grove High. Curtis' musical interests, particularly in playing the trumpet, sparks Billy's interest into the rhythmic patterns of jazz music.

Later in Season 2, a time-traveling Kimberly would recruit Billy's ancestor, also named William Cranston, in the 1880s to become the first Blue Ranger when she assembled and took command of the Wild West Ranger team in a battle against Goldar and several other time traveling foes. Also in Season 2, Billy commands the Unicorn Thunderzord.

In season 3, Billy gained new powers from Ninjor, who gave him the Wolf Power Coin, and became the Blue Ninja Ranger.

Mighty Morphin Alien Rangers
The Rangers are de-aged by a time reversal spell performed by Rita Repulsa's father, Master Vile. Billy devised a plan to restore the Rangers' ages using a machine that ran off the power coins. Billy restored himself, but Rita and Goldar stole the machine, and Lord Zedd and Rita Repulsa destroyed all six Ninja Power Coins. With his Wolf Ninja Coin destroyed and his Triceratops Power Coin damaged beyond use, Billy's role changed. He no longer fought as a Power Ranger, but rather acted solely in an advisory and supporting role. Indeed, Billy was the only Ranger in this period still to be acted out by his regular actor – the others had been replaced temporarily by child actors after Master Vile had used the Orb of Doom to revert time by approximately ten years. Billy acted in this period as a liaison between the Aquitian Rangers and Earth. It was the cure for Billy's reverse-aging that eventually served as the plot device by which he was removed from the show. When Power Rangers Zeo began, Billy officially retired from active Ranger service as the six-man team now only had the five segments of the Zeo Crystal as a power source for each member of the team, allowing Tanya to take his place while he continued his supporting role by creating and maintaining most of the weaponry, gadgets and Zords the Zeo Rangers would use.

Power Rangers Zeo
The writers left the choice open as to whether or not Billy would become a Zeo Ranger, with him musing at the start of Zeo that he could always assume the Zeo power in an emergency. He graduated earlier than the rest of the team in "Graduation Blues," and then left Earth for a brief period to address problems on the planet Aquitar. In "Mr. Billy's Wild Ride," he returns to Earth, although he is attacked by the machine empire along the way.

Before the Gold Ranger's identity was revealed as Trey of Triforia, the writers left several red herrings to mislead the viewers into believing that the Gold Ranger was Billy since he was never around when the Gold Ranger was around. When Trey of Triforia returned to Triforia on sabbatical to try to unify his three selves, Billy was selected to assume the Gold Ranger's powers. However, the negative proton energy that his body had absorbed in the Command Center's explosion prevented him from taking the powers. Instead Jason Lee Scott, the former Red Ranger, received the powers.

By the time of Jason's return it's shown that Billy has worked his way up to a black belt in karate.

Billy was last seen in two of the final Zeo episodes suffering from accelerated aging, a side effect from the regenerator he used to restore his proper age. To counter this, he traveled to Aquitar for a cure from their Eternal Falls (analogous to the Fountain of Youth), which would restore his real age; after that he opted to remain there with Cestria, a female Aquitian with whom he had fallen in love.

Power Rangers Super Megaforce
During the final episode of Power Rangers Super Megaforce - Legendary Battle - Billy participates in the eponymous battle as the Blue Mighty Morphin Power Ranger alongside other past and present Power Rangers. Yost does not reprise the role for this morphed appearance.

Power Rangers Beast Morphers
Billy makes another morphed appearance as the Blue Mighty Morphin Power Ranger for a second season episode of Power Rangers Beast Morphers - Grid Connection. The episode saw Austin St. John reprise the role of Jason Lee Scott, the Red Mighty Morphin Power Ranger. Jason summons the other four core Mighty Morphin Power Rangers and the Dino Thunder rangers to join him and the Dino Charge rangers in battling a resurrected Goldar Maximus. Again, Yost did not return; Billy has no dialogue and remains morphed throughout the appearance.

Mighty Morphin Power Rangers: Once and Always
For Hasbro PulseCon 2022, David Yost announced he would reprise the role of Billy to mark the 30th anniversary of the Power Rangers franchise. Mighty Morphin Power Rangers: Once and Always is set to be released on Netflix on April 19th 2023.

Film

Mighty Morphin Power Rangers: The Movie (1995)
Yost reprises the role of Billy for Mighty Morphin Power Rangers: The Movie, released in 1995, which sees the Power Rangers losing their powers after an encounter with the new villain Ivan Ooze (Paul Freeman). The Rangers go on a quest to restore their powers and save Zordon's life in the process. The events of the movie are non-canon to the television series, where a similar scenario plays out (minus Ivan Ooze) in the Ninja Quest saga near the start of the third season.

Power Rangers (2017)
William "Billy" Cranston appears in the 2017 reboot, played by actor RJ Cyler. In this version, he is autistic unlike in the TV series. At the start of the film, he is the archetypal nerd who is targeted by bullies. When Jason defends Billy from a bully during detention, Billy thanks Jason by deactivating his ankle monitor. The two then sneak off to an abandoned mine where Billy used to go with his deceased father. Eventually, along with Kimberly, Trini, and Zack, they come across the Power Coins and discover their destinies as the new Power Rangers. Initially, Billy expresses the most enthusiasm over being a Ranger, being the first to morph when he breaks up a fight between Jason and Zack, albeit accidentally. He is killed by Rita after she forces him to reveal the location of the Zeo Crystal, but Zordon sacrifices a chance to restore his own body to bring Billy back to life. When they morph for the first time and take the zords into battle, Billy initially accidentally 'drives' his zord backwards before turning it around in time for the final confrontation with Goldar.

Comics

Mighty Morphin Power Rangers: Pink
Kimberly is the main character in this comic book mini series published by Boom! Studios. The series is a modern remake but also serves as a continuation from Kimberly's exit in the third season of Mighty Morphin Power Rangers. Kimberly needs to rescue a French town under siege from Goldar and she seeks help from Zordon. She asks for the other rangers to aid her but is told they are off on another planet fighting Lord Zedd which explains Billy's absence. Zordon temporarily makes Kimberly the pink Power Ranger again by using the Sword of Light to activate the latent pink energy within her. Kimberly later shares this power with a civilian called Serge, making him the blue Mighty Morphin Power Ranger in place of Billy.

Other Appearances

Power/Rangers (2015 short film) 
In Power/Rangers Billy Cranston (played by Yves Bright), in this much darker reimagining, in this timeline the Machine Empire defeats the Power Rangers and destroys the Megazord in battle, Earth's governments negotiate a truce with the Machine Empire and the Power Rangers are disbanded. Billy became an openly-gay trillionaire who ended up buying Lockheed Martin and was found dead of an apparent suicide.

The Phantom Ranger Fan Theory

In Power Rangers Turbo, the fifth season of the series (and later in a few episodes of Power Rangers in Space), a mysterious Power Ranger with the ability to become invisible showed up and became an ally for the Turbo Rangers, who nicknamed him Phantom Ranger. His identity was never revealed, but Judd Lynn, executive producer of Turbo and Space, revealed that if he had to give the character an origin now, he would have made him a past Ranger and fixed on Billy as a potential, but stressed that this was only a brainstorm after the fact.

Behind the Scenes

David Yost has stated he had walked off the show a few episodes prior to his character's departure, due to repeated and ongoing homophobic slurs by the creators, producers, directors, and writers of the series, which is why he does not appear in them. However, producer Scott Page-Pagter has denied these statements, claiming Yost left over a salary dispute and had conflicts with members of the crew. As a result, stock footage of Yost was used for his departure and the character was voiced by someone else (In broadcasting Billy's departing message to his friends, it was mentioned they were having trouble with the signal). He was also the last of the original Power Ranger team to leave the show, although his former teammate Jason had returned as the Gold Ranger at that time.

It was widely believed that Billy's surname came from Bryan Cranston,  who did voice work for Mighty Morphin' Power Rangers, and would later portray Zordon in the 2017 film. Bryan Cranston was told this and it was later confirmed to him from an unknown source. However, in recent years, promotional material for an attempted Bioman adaptation by Haim Saban, from 1984, revealed that the surname was decided on long before Cranston became involved with the series.

References

External links
 Official Power Rangers Website

African-American superheroes
American superheroes
Fictional characters on the autism spectrum
Fictional hackers
Fictional inventors
Fictional karateka
Fictional Ninjutsu practitioners
Fictional polearm and spearfighters
Fictional scientists
Male superheroes
Mighty Morphin Power Rangers
Power Rangers characters
Power Rangers Zeo
Teenage characters in television
Television characters introduced in 1993